is a special ward located in Tokyo Metropolis, Japan. In English, it is known as Taitō City.

As of May 1, 2015, the ward has an estimated population of 186,276, and a population density of 18,420 persons per km2. This makes Taito ward the smallest of Tokyo's wards in area, and third-smallest in population.

History
The ward was founded on March 15, 1947, with the merger of the old Asakusa and Shitaya wards when Tokyo City was transformed into Tokyo Metropolis. During the Edo period, the Yoshiwara licensed quarter was in what is now Taitō. Taitō shares the same Chinese characters, "台東" with Taitung, a city in Taiwan.

Geography
Situated in the northeastern portion of the wards area of Tokyo, Taitō is surrounded by five other special wards: Chiyoda, Bunkyō, Arakawa, Sumida and Chūō.

Districts and neighborhoods

Asakusa Area
 Asakusa
 Asakusabashi
 Hanakawado
 Hashiba
 Higashi-Asakusa (East Asakusa)
 Imado
 Kaminarimon 
 Kiyokawa
 Kojima
 Komagata
 Kotobuki
 Kuramae
 Matsugaya
 Misuji
 Motoasakusa
 Nihonzutsumi (Japan dike)
 Nishi-Asakusa (West Asakusa)
 Torigoe
 Yanagibashi

Shitaya Area
 Akihabara
 Higashi-Ueno (East Ueno)
 Ikenohata
 Iriya
 Kita-Ueno (North Ueno)
 Minowa
 
 Ryusen
 Senzoku
 Shitaya
 Taito
 Ueno
 Ueno-koen (Ueno Park)
 Uenosakuragi
 Yanaka

Landmarks
Taitō is famous for its typical Shitamachi districts.

Temples and shrines
Sensō-ji and Kaminarimon (Thunder Gate)
Asakusa Shrine
Akiba Shrine
Kan'ei-ji
Kishibojin
Ueno Tōshō-gū
Zenshō-an

Parks

Asakusa Park
Kyu-Iwasaki-tei Garden 
Sumida Park
Ueno Park
Yanaka Park

Museums and zoos
Amuse Museum
Asakura Sculpture Hall
Daimyo Clock Museum
National Museum of Western Art
National Museum of Nature and Science
Tokyo Metropolitan Art Museum
Tokyo National Museum
Ueno no Mori Museum
Ueno Zoo
Yokoyama Taikan Memorial Hall

Entertainment

Suzumoto Engeijo (Suzumoto Vaudeville Hall)
Asakusa Vaudeville Hall

Education

Colleges and universities
 Tokyo National University of Fine Arts and Music
 Ueno Gakuen University

Primary and secondary schools
Prefectural public high schools are operated by the Tokyo Metropolitan Government Board of Education.

 
 
 
 
 Ueno Shinobugaoka High School
 Taito Commercial High School
 Taito Chuyakan High School

Private schools:
 

The school district of the metropolis also operates one metropolitan junior high school:

The Taito City Board of Education (台東区教育委員会) operates municipal elementary and junior high schools.

Municipal junior high schools:
 Asakusa Junior High School (浅草中学校)
 Hakuyo Junior High School (柏葉中学校)
 Komagata Junior High School (駒形中学校)
 Okachimachi Taito Junior High School (御徒町台東中学校)
 Sakurabashi Junior High School (台東区立桜橋中学校)
 Shinobugaoka Junior High School (忍岡中学校)
 Ueno Junior High School (上野中学校)

Municipal elementary schools:
 Asakusa Elementary School (浅草小学校)
 Fuji Elementary School (富士小学校)
 Heisei Elementary School (平成小学校)
 Higashi Asakusa Elementary School (東浅草小学校)
 Ishihama Elementary School (石浜小学校)
 Kanasogi Elementary School (金曽木小学校)
 Kinryu Elementary School (金竜小学校)
 Kuramae Elementary School (蔵前小学校)
 Kuromon Elementary School (黒門小学校)
 Matsuba Elementary School (松葉小学校)
 Negishi Elementary School (根岸小学校)
 Senzoku Elementary School (千束小学校)
 Shinobugaoka Elementary School (忍岡小学校)
 Taisho Elementary School (大正小学校)
 Taito Ikuei Elementary School (台東育英小学校)
 Tawara Elementary School (田原小学校)
 Tosen Elementary School (東泉小学校)
 Ueno Elementary School (上野小学校)
 Yanaka Elementary School (谷中小学校)

Public libraries
Taito operates several public libraries, including the Central Library, the Central Library Asakusabashi Branch, the Negishi Library, and the Ishihama Library. The Central Library is located in the first and second floors of the Lifelong Learning Center.

Other
The city operates the Lifelong Learning Center, a complex including a multi-media room, a studio, and other facilities. The Central Library is on the first and second floors of the Lifelong Learning Center.

Economy
Eiken Chemical, a clinical diagnostics and equipment manufacturer, has its headquarters in Taito.
Tokyo Ricoh Office Solution and Ricoh Technosystems, divisions of Ricoh, are headquartered in Taitō as of 2008. Chikumashobo, a publisher, has its headquarters in the  area of the ward.

Retail
 Matsuzakaya department store in Ueno
 Matsuya department store in Asakusa

Other
 Taiyo Yuden, electronics and materials company in Ueno

Events
 Sumidagawa Fireworks Festival
 Asakusa Samba Carnival
 Torigoe Shrine Matsuri
 Sanja Matsuri, one of the three great festivals of Tokyo

Transportation

Rail
JR East
Tōhoku Shinkansen, Jōetsu Shinkansen, Akita Shinkansen, Yamagata Shinkansen: Ueno Station
Tōhoku Main Line
Yamanote Line, Keihin-Tōhoku Line: Okachimachi, Ueno, Uguisudani Stations. Also, Nippori Station (on the boundary with Taitō)
Utsunomiya Line, Takasaki Line: Ueno Station
Jōban Line: Officially, the line begins at Nippori Station, although most trains start/terminate at Ueno Station
Tokyo Metro
Ginza Line: Ueno-Hirokoji, Inarichō, Tawaramachi, Asakusa Stations
Hibiya Line: Okachimachi, Ueno, Iriya, Minowa Stations
Tokyo Metropolitan Bureau of Transportation
Toei Asakusa Line: Asakusa-bashi, Kuramae, Asakusa Stations
Toei Ōedo Line: Ueno-Okachimachi, Shin-Okachimachi, Kuramae Stations
Keisei Electric Railway Keisei Main Line: Keisei Ueno Station
Tobu Railway Skytree Line: Asakusa Station
Tsukuba Express: Shin-Okachimachi, Asakusa Stations

Highways
Shuto Expressway
 Ueno Route
National highways

Sports and recreation
The City of Taito operates the Taito Riverside Sports Center. The center includes a gymnasium, tennis courts, two baseball fields for adults, one baseball field for children, one large swimming pool, one children's pool, and an athletic field. The gymnasium includes two courts, two budo halls, a Japanese-style archery range, a sumo ring, a training room, a table tennis room, an air-rifle shooting range, and a meeting room.

People
 Remi Hirano, Japanese chef, TV personality and chanson singer
 Makoto Shimizu, Japanese Musician
 Nobuo Kaneko, Japanese actor
 Toriyama Sekien, ukiyo-e artist of Japanese folklore

References

External links

Taitō City Official Website 

 
Wards of Tokyo